The ampullary cupula, or cupula, is a structure in the vestibular system, providing the sense of spatial orientation.

The cupula is located within the ampullae of each of the three semicircular canals. Part of the crista ampullaris, the cupula has embedded within it hair cells that have several stereocilia associated with each kinocilium. The cupula itself is the gelatinous component of the crista ampullaris that extends from the crista to the roof of the ampullae. When the head rotates, the endolymph filling the semicircular ducts initially lags behind due to inertia. As a result, the cupula is deflected opposite the direction of head movement.  As the endolymph pushes the cupula, the stereocilia is bent as well, stimulating the hair cells within the crista ampullaris. After a short time of continual rotation however, the endolymph's acceleration normalizes with the rate of rotation of the semicircular ducts. As a result, the cupula returns to its resting position and the hair cells cease to be stimulated. This continues until the head stops rotating which simultaneously halts semicircular duct rotation. Due to inertia, however, the endolymph continues on.  As the endolymph continues to move, the cupula is once again deflected resulting in the compensatory movements of the body when spun. In only the first situation, as fluid rushes by the cupula, the hair cells stimulated transmit the corresponding signal to the brain through the vestibulocochlear nerve (CN VIII). In the second one, there is no stimulation as the kinocilium can only be bent in one direction.

In their natural orientation within the head, the cupulae are located on the medial aspect of the semicircular canals. In this orientation, the kinocilia rest on the posterior aspect of the cupula.

Effects of alcohol

The Buoyancy Hypothesis posits that alcohol causes vertigo by affecting the neutral buoyancy of the cupula within the surrounding fluid called the endolymph. Linear accelerations (such as that of gravity) should not in theory effect a movement of the cupula when it is neutrally buoyant. The Buoyancy Hypothesis assumes that alcohol, with a different specific gravity from that of the cupula/endolymph, diffuses at different rates into the cupula and the surrounding endolymph. The result is a temporary density gradient between the cupula and endolymph, and a consequent (erroneous) sensitivity to linear accelerations such as that of gravity by a system normally signalling rotational accelerations. This sensation is commonly referred to as "the spins" .

References

Mann, Michael D. "Vestibular System." The Nervous System In Action. 2007. Web. 8 Dec. 2011. <https://web.archive.org/web/20111126234002/http://www.unmc.edu/physiology/Mann/index.html>.
Saladin, Kenneth S. Anatomy & Physiology: the Unity of Form and Function. New York, NY: McGraw-Hill, 2012. Print.
"VEDA – Vestibular Disorders Association – Sensory Input." VEDA – Vestibular Disorders Association – Vestibular Disorders Home. Web. 09 Dec. 2011. <http://www.vestibular.org/vestibular-disorders/balance/sensory-input.php>.

External links
 http://faculty.une.edu/com/abell/histo/CristaAmp.jpg
 http://www.kumc.edu/instruction/medicine/anatomy/histoweb/eye_ear/ear04.htm
 http://www.anatomyatlases.org/MicroscopicAnatomy/Section16/Plate16314.shtml
 https://web.archive.org/web/20070703152544/http://education.vetmed.vt.edu/curriculum/VM8054/Labs/Lab11/Ear/EXAMPLES/Excrista.htm

Sensory organs
Vestibular system